South Northamptonshire is a constituency represented in the House of Commons of the UK Parliament since its 2010 recreation by Andrea Leadsom, a Conservative who served as Secretary of State for Business, Energy and Industrial Strategy until 13 February 2020. She was Leader of the House of Commons from 2017 to 2019, and Secretary of State for Environment, Food and Rural Affairs from 2016 to 2017.  The seat of South Northamptonshire is considered a Conservative safe seat with  having elected a Conservative MP at every election for 110 Years. Current Conservative MP Andrea Leadsom was re-elected in 2019 with an increased majority.

Constituency profile
This is a rural seat around Towcester and Brackley but also includes the southern edge of Northampton. There is a significant motorsport sector including Silverstone. Incomes and house prices are above average for the UK.

History
Before 2010, the constituency existed from 1832 to 1918, and from 1950 to 1974, however on different boundaries during each period. It elected two Members of Parliament (MPs) by the bloc vote system of election from 1832, until the representation was reduced in 1885 to one member elected by the first past the post system.

Prominent members
Three names feature prominently among the area's Commons members, the 3rd and 5th Earl Spencer (during their tenures as MP having a courtesy title only, Viscount Althorp – Althorp is a major country house in the seat, well known as the childhood home of Diana, Princess of Wales);  Edward Fitzroy (son of Lord Southampton), Speaker of the House of Commons from 1928 until his death in 1943; and lastly, Reginald Manningham-Buller, 1st Viscount Dilhorne who on accomplishment of a peerage sat for the final two years of his life as the historic equivalent of the President of the Supreme Court of the United Kingdom with additional functions, the Lord Chancellor.

In the 19th century history of the seat the Cartwright family (with three members) lived in the stately home Aynhoe Park near Banbury.

History of boundaries
The seat was abolished in 1918 to form the new constituency of Daventry, then recreated in 1950 caused by a relatively short-lived abolition of Daventry.  In 1974 the constituency was almost wholly swallowed up by a reborn Daventry, which on wide boundaries saw substantial population growth.

This called for recreation in 2010 whereby most of the electoral wards were taken from the former version of the Daventry seat.

Present bordering constituencies
The constituency is bordered by Daventry and Northampton South to the north, Wellingborough to the north east, Milton Keynes North and Milton Keynes South to the south east, Buckingham to the south, Banbury to the south west and Kenilworth and Southam to the west.

Boundaries

1832–1885: The Hundreds of Kings Sutton, Chipping Warden, Greens Norton, Cleley, Towcester, Fawsley, Wymersley, Spelhoe, Nobottle Grove, and Guilsborough.

1885–1918: The Sessional Divisions of Brackley and Towcester, and part of the Sessional Division of Daventry.

1950–1974: The Boroughs of Daventry and Brackley, and the Rural Districts of Brackley, Daventry, Northampton, and Towcester.

2010–present: The District of South Northamptonshire wards of Astwell, Blakesley, Blisworth, Brackley East, Brackley South, Brackley West, Chase, Cogenhoe, Collingtree, Cosgrove, Courteenhall, Deanshanger, Grafton, Kings Sutton, Kingthorn, Little Brook, Middleton Cheney, Salcey, Silverstone, Steane, Tove, Towcester Brook, Towcester Mill, Wardoun, Washington, Whittlewood, and Yardley, and the Borough of Northampton wards of East Hunsbury, Nene Valley, and West Hunsbury.

Members of Parliament

MPs 1832–1885

MPs 1885–1918

MPs 1950–1974

MPs since 2010

Elections

Elections in the 2020s

Elections in the 2010s

Elections in the 1970s

Elections in the 1960s

Elections in the 1950s

Election results 1868–1918

Elections in the 1860s

Elections in the 1870s

Elections in the 1880s 

Cartwright's death caused a by-election.

Elections in the 1890s

Elections in the 1900s

Elections in the 1910s 

General Election 1914–15:

Another General Election was required to take place before the end of 1915. The political parties had been making preparations for an election to take place and by July 1914, the following candidates had been selected; 
Unionist: Edward FitzRoy
Liberal: Arthur Augustus Thomas

Election results 1832–1868

Elections in the 1830s

Elections in the 1840s

 

Cartwright resigned by accepting the office of Steward of the Chiltern Hundreds, causing a by-election.

Elections in the 1850s

 

 
  

Spencer succeeded to the peerage, becoming 5th Earl Spencer and causing a by-election.

Elections in the 1860s

See also
List of parliamentary constituencies in Northamptonshire

Notes

References

Parliamentary constituencies in Northamptonshire
Constituencies of the Parliament of the United Kingdom established in 1832
Constituencies of the Parliament of the United Kingdom disestablished in 1918
Constituencies of the Parliament of the United Kingdom established in 1950
Constituencies of the Parliament of the United Kingdom disestablished in 1974
Constituencies of the Parliament of the United Kingdom established in 2010